Painthorpe is a residential area in the Wakefield district, in the English county of West Yorkshire. It is situated southwest of Crigglestone.

Amenities
Painthorpe has a primary school which it is proposed will amalgamate with Kettlethorpe High School in 2018.

Location grid

References
West Yorkshire A-Z

Suburbs of Wakefield